Talos Records was created in 1958 in Augusta, Georgia by Charles Douglas and a future governor of Georgia, Carl Sanders, as a grand experiment to capture the sounds of the many bands and individuals in the Augusta area.  After two releases, "Rock & Roll Country Boy" by local TV entertainers, Curly Millikan and the Sundowners and a hot rock release by Bill Johnson & The Four Steps Of Rhythm, "You Better Dig It", the original owners vacated the company and left it in the hands of producer Bob Ritter.

Ritter kept the company going until the early 70's. He also created another label called KIP Records.  The company was moved to Tifton, Georgia in 1965.  There were over 30 releases on both labels.  Some are very valuable to collectors now.

See also
 List of record labels

American record labels
Record labels established in 1958
Record labels disestablished in 1971
1958 establishments in Georgia (U.S. state)